Hans Minder (born 28 August 1908, date of death unknown) is a Swiss wrestler. He was Olympic bronze medalist in Freestyle wrestling in 1928.

References

External links
 

1908 births
Year of death missing
Olympic wrestlers of Switzerland
Wrestlers at the 1928 Summer Olympics
Swiss male sport wrestlers
Olympic bronze medalists for Switzerland
Olympic medalists in wrestling
Medalists at the 1928 Summer Olympics
20th-century Swiss people